The Tallapoosa shiner (Cyprinella gibbsi) is a species of fish in the family Cyprinidae. It is endemic to the United States, where it occurs in the Tallapoosa River system in Alabama and Georgia.

References

Cyprinella
Taxa named by James David Williams
Fish described in 1971